Walter Frederick Whittard (1902–1966) was professor of geology at the University of Bristol.

Awards and honours
Whittard received the Murchison Medal of the Geological Society of London in 1965 and was elected a Fellow of the Royal Society.

References

Fellows of the Royal Society
Fellows of the Geological Society of London
1902 births
1966 deaths